Karl Probst is a German former pair skater. With his skating partner, Eva Neeb, he became a three-time West German national medalist and competed at five ISU Championships in the 1950s.

Career 
Neeb and Probst trained together in Munich. They competed internationally for West Germany and finished on the national podium three times, winning silver in 1953 and 1956 and bronze in 1955. They competed at the 1953 European Championships in Dortmund, West Germany; 1953 World Championships in Davos, Switzerland; 1954 European Championships in Bolzano, Italy; 1956 European Championships in Paris, France; and 1956 World Championships in Garmisch-Partenkirchen, West Germany.

Neeb and Probst also competed in roller skating.

Competitive highlights 
with Neeb

References 

20th-century births
German male pair skaters
Living people
Sportspeople from Munich
Year of birth missing (living people)